Evergreen Cemetery is a historic cemetery in Ocala, Marion County, Florida. Established  July 8, 1850, it was Ocala's first public cemetery. A historical marker was placed at the site. Volunteer cleanup efforts have taken place.

Burials
 Robert Bullock, Confederate Army brigadier general, teacher, lawyer, judge, public official, state representative, and U.S. Representative
 Samuel Harrison Coleman, A.M.E clergyman who died in a railway accident
 John Franklin Dunn, for whom Dunnellon, Florida, is named
 James Byeram Owens, delegate to the Florida secession convention and Confederate Provisional Congress
 Samuel Small, clergyman and state representative during the Reconstruction era
 Benjamin Waldo, doctor for whom Waldo, Florida, is named
 Ebenezer Harris, owner of the Ocala House Hotel and founder of Citra
 Ocala's first mayor

References

External links
 

Cemeteries in Florida
Cemeteries established in the 1850s
1850 establishments in Florida
Ocala, Florida